The King of Hungary was the ruling head of state of the Kingdom of Hungary from 1000 (or 1001) to 1918. The style of title "Apostolic King of Hungary" (Apostoli Magyar Király) was endorsed by Pope Clement XIII in 1758 and used afterwards by all Monarchs of Hungary.

Establishment of the title
Before 1000 AD, Hungary was not recognized as a kingdom and the ruler of Hungary was styled Grand Prince of the Hungarians. The first King of Hungary, Stephen I. was crowned on 25 December 1000 (or 1 January 1001) with the crown Pope Sylvester II had sent him and with the consent of Otto III, Holy Roman Emperor.

Following King Stephen I's coronation, all the monarchs of Hungary and the Árpád dynasty used the title "King". However, not all rulers of Hungary were kings—for example, Stephen Bocskai and Francis II Rákóczi were proclaimed rulers as "High Princes of Hungary", and there were also three Governors of Hungary who were sometimes styled "regents", János Hunyadi, Lajos Kossuth and Miklós Horthy.

Legal requirements for a coronation to be legitimate

From the 13th century on, a process was established to confirm the legitimacy of the King. No person could become the legitimate King of Hungary without fulfilling the following criteria:
 Coronation by the Archbishop of Esztergom
 Coronation with the Holy Crown of Hungary
 Coronation at Székesfehérvár Basilica
This meant a certain level of protection to the integrity of the Kingdom. For example, stealing the Holy Crown of Hungary was no longer enough to become legitimate King.

The first requirement (coronation by the Archbishop of Esztergom) was confirmed by Béla III, who had been crowned by Archbishop Berthold of Kalocsa, based on the special authorisation of Pope Alexander III. After his coronation he declared that this coronation would not affect the customary claim of the Archbishop of Esztergom to crown the king. In 1211, Pope Innocent III refused to confirm the agreement of Archbishop John of Esztergom and Archbishop Berthold of Kalocsa on the transfer of the claim, and he declared that only the Archbishop of Esztergom was entitled to crown the King of Hungary.

King Charles I of Hungary was crowned in May 1301 with a provisional crown in Esztergom by the Archbishop of that city; this led to his second coronation in June 1309. At that time the Holy Crown wasn't used, and he was crowned in Buda by the Archbishop of Esztergom. However, his final third coronation was in 1310, in Székesfehérvár, with the Holy Crown and by the Archbishop of Esztergom. Then the King's coronation was considered absolutely legitimate.

On the other hand, in 1439, the dowager queen Elizabeth of Luxemburg ordered one of her handmaidens to steal the Holy Crown from the palace of Visegrád, and then promoted the coronation of her newborn son Ladislaus V, which was carried out legitimately in Székesfehérvár by the Archbishop of Esztergom.

A similar situation occurred with Matthias Corvinus, when he negotiated for return of the Holy Crown, which was in the possession of Frederick III, Holy Roman Emperor. After it was returned, Matthias was legitimately crowned.

Inheriting the throne

As in all the traditional monarchies, the heir descended through the male line from a previous King of Hungary. In accordance with Hungarian tradition, this right usually passed to younger brothers, before passing to the son of the previous King, which caused family disputes on many occasions. The founder of the first Hungarian royal house was Árpád, who led his people into the Carpathian Basin in 895. His descendants, who ruled for more than 400 years, included Saint Stephen I, Saint Ladislaus I, Andrew II, and Béla IV. In 1301 the last member of the House of Árpád died, and Charles I was crowned, claiming the throne in the name of his paternal grandmother Mary, the daughter of Stephen V. With the death of Mary, the granddaughter of Charles I, in 1395, the direct line was interrupted again, and Mary's husband Sigismund continued reigning, after being elected by the nobility of the Kingdom in the name of the Holy Crown.

Later, Matthias Corvinus was elected by the nobles of the Kingdom, being the first Hungarian monarch who descended from an aristocratic family, and not from a royal family that inherited the title. The same happened decades later with John Zápolya, who was elected in 1526 after the death of Louis II in the battle of Mohács.

After this, the House of Habsburg inherited the throne, and ruled Hungary from Austria for almost 400 years until 1918.

Other titles used by the King of Hungary

Over the centuries, the Kings of Hungary acquired or claimed the crowns of several neighboring countries, and they began to use the royal titles connected to those countries. By the time of the last kings, their precise style was: "By the Grace of God, Apostolic King of Hungary, Dalmatia, Croatia, Slavonia, Rama, Serbia, Galicia, Lodomeria, Cumania and Bulgaria, Grand Prince of Transylvania, Count of the Székelys".

The title "Apostolic King" was confirmed by Pope Clement XIII in 1758 and used thereafter by all the Kings of Hungary.

The title of "King of Slavonia" referred to the territories between the Drava and the Sava Rivers. That title was first used by Ladislaus I. It was also Ladislaus I who adopted the title "King of Croatia" in 1091. Coloman added the phrase "King of Dalmatia" to the royal style in 1105.

The title "King of Rama", referring to the claim to Bosnia, was first used by Béla II in 1136. It was Emeric who adopted the title "King of Serbia". The phrase "King of Galicia" was used to indicate the supremacy over Halych, while the title  "King of Lodomeria" referred to Volhynia; both titles were adopted by Andrew II in 1205. In 1233, Béla IV began to use the title "King of Cumania" which expressed the rule over the territories settled by the Cumans (i.e., Wallachia and Moldavia) at that time. The phrase "King of Bulgaria" was added to the royal style by Stephen V.

Transylvania was originally a part of the Kingdom of Hungary ruled by a voivode, but after 1526 became a semi-independent principality vassal to the Ottoman Empire, and later to the Habsburg monarchy. In 1696, after dethroning Prince Michael II Apafi, Leopold I took the title "Prince of Transylvania". In 1765, Maria Theresa elevated Transylvania to the status of Grand Principality.

The "Count of the Székelys" was originally a dignitary of the Kingdom of Hungary, but the title was later used by the Princes of Transylvania. The title was revived during the reign of Maria Theresa who adopted it at the request of the Székelys.

Length of reign

See also
 Apostolic King
 Grand Prince of the Hungarians
 Lands of the Crown of Saint Stephen
 Regent of Hungary

Notes

References

 Korai Magyar Történeti Lexikon (9–14. század), főszerkesztő: Kristó, Gyula, szerkesztők: Engel, Pál és Makk, Ferenc (Akadémiai Kiadó, Budapest, 1994).
 Magyarország Történeti Kronológiája I-III. – A kezdetektől 1526-ig; 1526–1848, 1848–1944, főszerkesztő: Benda, Kálmán (Akadémiai Kiadó, Budapest, 1981, 1982, 1993).
 Magyar Történelmi Fogalomtár I-II. – A-K; L-ZS, főszerkesztő: Bán, Péter (Gondolat, Budapest, 1989).

External links
Titles of European hereditary rulers – Hungary: Bibliography.

Kingdom of Hungary
Hungarian royalty
Hungary
1000 establishments in Europe
10th-century establishments in Hungary
1918 disestablishments in Austria-Hungary